Nils Thornander (3 May 1958 – 10 June 2022) was a Swedish-born French visual artist and composer.

Biography
Thornander was born in Stockholm in 1958 to a Swedish father and a French mother. He attended the Franska Skolan, founded for French students in Stockholm in 1862. At the age of 15, he moved to France and attended the Lycée Condorcet. He was interviewed in front of the school in 1973 on the lowering of the voting age to 18.

Training
Thornander decided early on to become an experimental artist. In 1994, he wrote his "Continuum manifesto" for the Swedish magazine , in which he theorized artistic contribution to the contemporary world. His approach inspired artist  to write Wem är Nils Thornander?. Art critic  described him as a "geographer of chaos". His works were "a committed approach to achieve harmony", according to Isabelle Kevorkian.

Plastic creations
Thornander started out painting oil on canvas, but in the late 1980s began to prefer a technique involving immersive hypercubes. He preferred the use of electric light from light boxes as opposed to natural lighting. He worked with Mildred Simantov on "Refectory", presented at the Musée Carnavalet during the Nuit Blanche in 2010, as well as the book-album "L’Age adulte, le Tuning Book", presented at the Palais de Tokyo.

Musical and sound creations
In 1998  collaborated with Thornander to created music for the documentary "Putzen in Paris/Paris poussière". He also led sound design for Magnus Bärtås's "Claims of Victory", presented in Seoul in 2015. In 2019, he created the musical work "Absolute Value", created at IRCAM.

Death
Nils Thornander died in Paris on 10 June 2022 at the age of 64.

Exhibitions and public works
Hommage à Coustou, les Chevaux de Marly (1985)
The Digital Woman (1988)
Continuum in Stockholm (1989)
Les Territoires du Corps (1990)
Hypercorps / L'Interdit (1992)
Nils Thornander's Continuum (1993)
Max Jacob (1996)
Are You Scared of Girls (1999)
Vulvabration, hyperconference (2004)
Viva la vulva, hyperconference (2007)
Vulvaroom et politique intérieure (2008)
My private art life (2015)
Like Me (2016)
Je peins (2017)
Shoe Badoo Bad (2018)
Speed Bump (2018)
Absolute Value, extract 1 (2019)
Flags for Future Identities (2019)

References

1958 births
2022 deaths
Swedish contemporary artists
Swedish people of French descent
French artists
Artists from Stockholm